Maitena Burundarena (Buenos Aires, May 19, 1962), better known as Maitena, is an Argentine cartoonist.

Early works
Maitena drew erotic strips for several European publications, for example Makoki, in Barcelona.

She also worked as a graphic illustrator for Argentine magazines and newspapers, as well as publishers specialized in school texts. She was also a TV screenwriter, restaurateur and bar owner.

Her work was compiled in a book called Y en este rincón, las mujeres.

Mujeres Alteradas
In 1993, Para Ti -a leading Argentine women's magazine- approached her to do a weekly humor page. Such was the origin of Mujeres Alteradas ("Women on the Edge"), a comic strip now published widely throughout the world. In 1999, Mujeres Alteradas was 'translated' from Argentine Spanish to European Spanish and started appearing in El País Semanal, the Sunday edition of El País, from Madrid. Mujeres Alteradas has been translated into several languages.

The strips have been collected into five books published by Lumen in Spain and Sudamericana, in Argentina. Mujeres Alteradas has sold 150,000 books just in Argentina.

Superadas
Between 1998 and 2003, Maitena also published a daily comic panel in  La Nación´s humor section, under the name Superadas. This strip is currently published in several Argentine newspapers such as La Voz del Interior (Córdoba) and Los Andes (Mendoza). The strip is also published in several other international newspapers.

Towards the end of 2002, selected strips were published as a book named Superadas 1.

In June 2003, Maitena began to publish the Sunday strip Curvas peligrosas in La Nación.

A General Feature of Maitena's Work
Unlike many fellow Argentine humourists (such as Quino in Mafalda, Caloi, Roberto Fontanarrosa or ), who rely on their characters' circumstances, Maitena focuses on the inner feelings of the female world.

Personal life
She is of Basque (maitena is Basque for "the most beloved") and Polish ancestry.
Her father, was a Basque-stock conservative academician, the last Minister of Education (Argentina) of the Argentine dictatorship of the 1980s (he was previously chancellor of the National Technological University). Her mother was an architect with Polish ancestry.
Maitena lives in Argentina. She is married and has three children.

Published works
Women on the Edge 1
Women on the Edge 2
Women on the Edge 3
Women on the Edge 4
Women on the Edge 5
Curvas Peligrosas 1
Curvas Peligrosas 2
Superadas 1
Superadas 2
Superadas 3

Notes

External links 
 Official page
 Burundarena, Maitena at the Spanish-language Auñamendi Encyclopedia.
 Interview for EuskoNews & Media (Nº 309 - 2005/07/15-22) by Julia López. Spanish language with RealMedia audio and Basque translation.

1962 births
Living people
20th-century Argentine women artists
21st-century Argentine women artists
Artists from Buenos Aires
Argentine cartoonists
Argentine people of Basque descent
Argentine people of Spanish descent
Argentine people of Polish descent
Argentine people of Polish-Jewish descent
Drinking establishment owners